Zakrzewo-Kopijki  is a village in the administrative district of Gmina Zaręby Kościelne, within Ostrów Mazowiecka County, Masovian Voivodeship, in east-central Poland.

The village has a population of 160.

References

Zakrzewo-Kopijki